Levity may refer to
 a sense of amusement, the opposite of gravitas
 Levity (film)
 Levity (soundtrack), the soundtrack for the film of the same name
 Levity Entertainment Group, a production, branding, and entertainment company based in Los Angeles